Wasmannia is a genus of ants. Wasmannia auropunctata is known as the electric ant or little fire ant and are considered by many countries to be a destructive, highly invasive species.

Species
Wasmannia affinis Santschi, 1929
Wasmannia auropunctata (Roger, 1863)
Wasmannia iheringi Forel, 1908
Wasmannia lutzi Forel, 1908
Wasmannia rochai Forel, 1912
Wasmannia scrobifera Kempf, 1961
Wasmannia sigmoidea (Mayr, 1884)
Wasmannia sulcaticeps Emery, 1894
Wasmannia villosa Emery, 1894
Wasmannia williamsoni Kusnezov, 1952

References

External links

Little fire ant, Wasmannia auropunctata on the UF / IFAS Featured Creatures Web site

Myrmicinae
Ant genera